Anjani Kumar is an Indian Police Service officer serving as the Director General of Police of Telangana. He took the charge on 31 December 2022 succeeding M Mahendra Reddy.He is a 1990 batch IPS officer of the Telangana cadre. He has also served with the United Nations in Bosnia and Herzegovina from 1998 - 99.

Education 
He is an alumnus of Kirori Mal College, Delhi University and St. Xavier's, Patna. During his training at the Sardar Vallabhbhai Patel National Police Academy, he won the Maharaja of Tonk Cup for the Best Horse Rider of his batch and the RD Singh Cup for being the best swimmer of his batch.

Career 
Anjani Kumar has held the following posts during his career:
 31 December 2022: Director General of Police, Telangana state
 25 December 2021: Director General, Anti-Corruption Bureau, Telangana, Hyderabad City
 12 March 2018: Commissioner of Police, Hyderabad city.
 Additional Director General of Police (Law and Order), Telangana
 Additional Commissioner of Police (Law and Order), Hyderabad city
 Inspector General of Police, Warangal Range, Telangana
 Deputy Inspector General of Police, Nizamabad Range, Telangana
 Chief of Greyhounds (elite anti-naxal unit), Telangana & Andhra Pradesh
 Chief of Counter Intelligence Cell
 Assistant Superintendent of Police, Jangaon, Telengana
 20 August 1990: Appointed to IPS

Awards 
 United Nations Peace Medal - 1999
 President's Police Medal for Distinguished Services - 2016
 Indian Police Medal for Meritorious Services - 2007
 Internal Security Medal for working in Naxal affected area

Works 
 Anjani Kumar is the co-author of and supervised the production of the coffee table book, Journey of the Hyderabad City Police with Noopur Kumar. Anjani Kumar was Additional Commissioner of Police, Law and Order, Hyderabad City during the time of the publication of the book.

References 

Indian police officers
Indian police chiefs
Living people
1966 births
People from Patna
Delhi University alumni
St. Xavier's Patna alumni